The Limbu script (also Sirijanga script) is used to write the Limbu language. It is a Brahmic type abugida.

History
According to traditional histories, the Limbu script was first invented in the late 9th century by Limbu King Sirijunga Hang and then fell out of use, only to be reintroduced in the 18th century by  Limbu scholar Te-ongsi Sirijunga Xin Thebe as during that time the teaching of the Limbu script was outlawed in Limbuwan and Sikkim.

Accounts with Sirijunga
The Limbu language is one of the few Sino-Tibetan languages of the Central Himalayas to possess their own scripts. (Sprigg 1959: 590), (Sprigg 1959: 591-592 & MS: 1-4) tells us that the Limbu or  Sirijunga script was devised during the period of Buddhist expansion in Sikkim in the early 18th century when Limbuwan still constituted part of Sikkimese territory. The Limbu script was probably composed at roughly the same time as the Lepcha script which was created by the third King of Sikkim, Chakdor Namgyal (ca. 1700-1717). The  Limbu script is ascribed to the Limbu hero, Te-ongsi Sirijunga Xin Thebe.

Structure
 
As an abugida, a basic letter represents both a consonant and an inherent, or default, vowel.

To change the inherent vowel, a diacritic is added:

 /kɔ/ represents the same syllable as  /kɔ/. Some writers avoid the  diacritic, considering it redundant.

Syllable-initial vowels use the vowel-carrier  with the appropriate dependent vowel sign. Used by itself,  represents syllable-initial /ɔ/. 

Initial consonant clusters are written with small marks following the main consonant:

Final consonants after short vowels are written with another set of marks, except for some final consonants occurring only in loanwords. They follow the marks for consonant clusters, if any.

Long vowels without a following final consonant are written with a diacritic called kemphreng.  For example,  /kɔː/.

There are two methods for writing long vowels with syllable-final consonants:
 Use the kemphreng diacritic and the final consonant, such as  /kɔːk/.
 Replace the final consonant with the corresponding full consonant and add an underscore-like diacritic mark.  This indicates that the consonant is final (vowel-less) and that the preceding vowel is lengthened.  For example:  /kɔːk/.  This same diacritic may be used to mark final consonants in loanwords that do not have final forms in Limbu, regardless of the length of the vowel.
The first method is widely used in Sikkim; the second method is advocated by certain writers in Nepal.

Glottalization is marked by a sign called mukphreng.  For example,  /kɔʔ/.

Sample text from Limbu Wikipedia 
ᤛᤧᤘᤠᤖᤥ᥄ ᤀᤠᤍᤠᤱᤒᤠ ᤜᤠᤍᤠᤱᤔᤠᤛᤣ ᤗᤠᤶᤎᤡᤱᤃᤥ ᤗᤠᤶᤎᤰ ᤕᤠᤰᤌᤢᤱᤐᤠᤴ ᤖᤧ ᤘᤡᤁᤡᤐᤡᤍᤡᤕᤠ ᤀᤥ ॥

ᤛᤧᤘᤠᤖᤥ᥄ ᤀᤠᤍᤠᤏᤠᤒᤠ ᤀᤠᤍᤠᤏᤠᤔ ᤀᤠᤛᤧ ᤗᤠᤶᤎ ᤀᤡᤏᤠᤃ ᤗᤠᤶᤎᤠᤁᤠ ᤕᤠᤰᤌᤢᤱ ᤐᤠᤏᤠ ᤖᤧ ᤘᤡᤁᤡᤐᤧᤍᤤ ᤀ।

ᤗᤡᤶᤒᤢ ᤓᤠᤙᤠᤁᤥ ᤘᤡᤁᤡᤐᤡ᤺ᤍᤡᤕᤠᤔᤠ ᤛᤫᤠᤃᤋ ᤇ।

ᤗᤡᤶᤒᤢ ᤓᤠᤛᤠᤁᤨ ᤘᤡᤁᤡᤐᤡᤍᤡᤕᤠ ᤀᤜᤡᤗᤧ ᤀᤡᤴᤁᤢᤒᤧᤛᤠᤏᤠ (ᤐᤠᤖᤣᤰᤙᤠᤏ ᤘᤡᤁᤡ) ᤀᤷᤌᤠᤳ ᤁᤨᤁᤨᤔᤠ ᤇᤠ।

ᤕᤛᤗᤠᤀᤡ᤺ ᤀᤃᤠᤍᤡ ᤒᤎᤠᤀᤢᤏᤠᤁᤠ ᤗᤠᤃᤡ ᤁᤠᤶᤋᤡᤔᤠ ᥈ ᤛᤠᤕᤠ ᤗᤧᤰ ᤗᤡᤶᤒᤢ ᤓᤠᤙᤠᤔᤠ ᤜᤢᤏᤠ ᤈᤠᤖᤥᤖᤣ ᤇᤠ। ᤋᤩᤛᤁᤠᤖᤏ ᤗᤡᤶᤒᤢ ᤓᤠᤙᤠᤔᤠ ᤗᤧᤂᤠᤜᤠᤖᤢ ᤗᤧᤰᤏᤠ ᤛᤢᤖᤢᤃᤠᤷᤏᤠ ᤛᤠᤒᤤ ᤗᤡᤶᤒᤢᤓᤠᤙᤡ ᤔᤡᤳᤖᤜᤠᤖᤢᤔᤠ ᤜᤠᤷᤍᤡᤰ ᤀᤠᤏᤢᤖᤨᤎ ᤇᤠ।

Obsolete characters
Three additional letters were used in early versions of the modern script:
  /d͡ʑʱɔ/
  /ɲɔ/
  /ʂɔ/ 
Two ligatures were used for Nepali consonant conjuncts:
  jña (for Devanagari )
  tra (for Devanagari )

Nineteenth-century texts used a small anusvara to mark nasalization.  This was used interchangeably with  /ŋ/.

The sign  was used for the exclamatory particle  (/lo/).

Punctuation
The main punctuation mark used in Limbu is the Devanagari double danda.  It has its own exclamation mark and question mark.

Digits
Limbu has its own set of digits:

Unicode

Limbu script was added to the Unicode Standard in April, 2003 with the release of version 4.0.

The Unicode block for Limbu is U+1900–U+194F:

References

Brahmic scripts
Writing systems of Nepal